Watson Creek is a stream in northern California.  It runs about 3 miles, from its source near Watson Lake, below Mount Watson, draining into Lake Tahoe.  The Tahoe Rim Trail runs across the creek in its headwaters meadow, and along the eastern shore of the lake.

The creek and lake and peak are named for Robert Montgomery Watson, who came to Lake Tahoe in 1875.  Watson built the Watson Log Cabin, the only historic log cabin in Tahoe City, California.

Watson Lake
The headwaters of Watson Creek is separated from Watson Lake by a granite ridge. The lake's outflow is a minor tributary that joins the creek just downstream.

Mount Watson
Mount Watson is a peak at  elevation, just north of Tahoe City, with commanding views of Lake Tahoe and a view of Watson Lake.

References

Rivers of California
Rivers of Placer County, California